The 1994–95 Slovenian Football Cup was the fourth season of the Slovenian Football Cup, Slovenia's football knockout competition.

Qualified clubs

1993–94 Slovenian PrvaLiga members
Beltinci
Celje
Gorica
Izola
Jadran Dekani
Koper
Krka
Ljubljana
Maribor
Mura
Naklo
Olimpija
Primorje
Rudar Velenje
Slovan
Svoboda

Qualified through MNZ Regional Cups
MNZ Ljubljana:  Zagorje, Kočevje
MNZ Maribor: Kovinar Maribor, Korotan Prevalje
MNZ Celje: Radeče, Dravinja
MNZ Koper: Ilirska Bistrica
MNZ Nova Gorica: Bilje
MNZ Murska Sobota: Serdica, Ižakovci
MNZ Lendava: Turnišče, Odranci
MNZG-Kranj: Triglav Kranj, Visoko
MNZ Ptuj: Aluminij, Bistrica

First round

|}

Round of 16

|}

Quarter-finals

|}

Semi-finals

|}

Final

First leg

Second leg

Slovenian Football Cup seasons
Cup
Slovenian Cup